The Mesostoinae is a subfamily of wasps endemic to Australia.It contains four genera:
 Andesipolis
 Hydrangeocola
 Mesostoa
 Proavga
        
The members of this family display sexual dimorphism, males are brachypterous, which means that they have reduced, non-functional wings. A unique feature of this subfamily is that all the known species are primary gall formers on Banksia.

References 

 Australian Faunal Directory
 Austin, A.D. & Dangerfield, P.C. (1998). Biology of the Mesostoa kerri Austin and Wharton (Insecta: Hymenoptera: Braconidae: Mesostoinae), an endemic Australian wasp that causes stem galls on Banksia marginata Cav. Aust. J. Bot. 46: 559-569

Braconidae
Hymenoptera subfamilies